Elias Allen (c.1588 in Tonbridge – March 1653 in London) was an English maker of sundials and scientific instruments.

Allen was apprenticed to a London clockmaker in 1602 and, after his master died, established himself in a workshop beside St Clement Danes Church, the Strand. He made instruments for James I and Charles I, among others, and was associated with the mathematicians Edmund Gunter and William Oughtred. His apprentices included Ralph Greatorex. He served from 19 January 1637 until 29 July 1638 as Master of the London Clockmakers' Company. He died in March 1653 and was buried in St Clement Danes.

A letter from William Oughtred to Allen, dated 20 August 1638, was recently found in the Macclesfield Collection with a reverse print  of the earliest known Oughtred sliderule. Oughtred writes, “I have here sent you directions (as you requested me being at Twickenham) about the making of the two rulers”. He also indicates he had never actually made the rule of his designs, “would gladly see one of [the two parts of the instrument] when it is finished: wch yet I never have done”.

References

Further reading
Allen, Elias (c.1588–1653), H. K. Higton, Oxford Dictionary of National Biography, Oxford University Press, 2004, online edn, Jan 2008
Elias Allen (c.1588–1653), Elizabethan Instrument Makers, Gerard L'Estrange Turner, Oxford University Press, 2000, pp31–32

External links
Archival record of 1638 letter from William Oughtred to Elias Allen (Janus Archive)
Example of clock from Allen's workshop (Victoria and Albert Museum)
Some account of the Worshipful company of clockmakers of the city of London (1881) (archive.org)
{http://pballew.blogspot.com/2015/08/on-this-day-in-math-august-20.html, earliest known slide rule, see Events 1638 ] (web page)

1580s births
1653 deaths
Clockmakers from the Kingdom of England
People from Tonbridge